The 1922–23 PCHA season was the 12th season of the professional men's ice hockey Pacific Coast Hockey Association league. Season play ran from November 13, 1922, until March 2, 1923.  The Vancouver Maroons club would be regular-season PCHA champions, and won the play-off with Victoria Aristocrats.

League business

The league finally dropped the position of rover, adopting the six-man hockey of the National Hockey League (NHL), eleven years after the National Hockey Association (NHA) dropped it.

The Vancouver Millionaires were renamed the Maroons, and the Victoria Aristocrats were renamed the Cougars. The season was increased to 30 games per team, including eight games against Western Canada Hockey League (WCHL) teams.

Vancouver acquired Corbett Denneny from Toronto for Jack Adams and signed Frank Boucher from Ottawa.

Frank Fredrickson had an outstanding season, scoring 41 goals in thirty games.

Regular season
Cyclone Taylor made the final appearance of his career on December 8 at Victoria.

Final standings
The standings include the interlocking games.
Note: W = Wins, L = Losses, T = Ties, GF= Goals For, GA = Goals against
Teams that qualified for the playoffs are highlighted in bold

Playoffs

The Maroons won the two-game total-goals series against Victoria 3-0, 2-3 (5-3)

The Maroons then played against the National Hockey League champion Ottawa in a best-of-five series for the right to play the WCHL champion for the Stanley Cup. Ottawa won the series 1-0, 1-4, 3-2, 5-1 (3-1).

Schedule and results

‡ at Seattle.

* at Vancouver.

† at Victoria.

Source: Coleman(1966).

Player statistics

Goaltending averages

Scoring leaders

See also
Pacific Coast Hockey Association
1922 in sports
1923 in sports

References

Notes

Bibliography

 
Pacific Coast Hockey Association seasons
PCHA
PCHA